Bila or Bílá may refer to:

Places
Bila, Ethiopia, formerly known as Billo and Billa, or its eponymous Bila Seyo region
Bila, a village in Schitu Commune, Romania
Bila (Livno), a village in Bosnia and Herzegovina
Bila, Vitez, a village in Bosnia and Herzegovina
Bila, Cameroon, a village in Cameroon
Bila River (disambiguation)
Slovenian name for Resiutta, a municipality in Italy
Bílá (Frýdek-Místek District), a municipality and village in the Czech Republic
Bílá (Liberec District), a municipality and village in the Czech Republic

Surname
Bílá, the feminine form of the Czech surname Bílý
Jedediah Bila, American TV host, author and columnist
Abdoul Bila, Burkinabé footballer
Vonani Bila, South African author and poet

Other
Bila (sun), the solar deity of the Adnyamathanha people
Bila language, a Bantu language spoken by the Mbuti Pygmies
Bila' language, the name for several extinct Mon–Khmer languages of Malaya
Battalions of Light Infantry of Africa (BILA)

See also